The Waimiri Atroari language is spoken by the Waimiri Atroari people. The current population is 2,009 (PWA, 2018), and they have 19 villages spread along the rivers of Camanau/Curiau, Alalaii, Jauaperi, and Rio Branquinho (Bruno 2003, 12). These are located in the northern part of the State of Amazonas, and the southern part of the State of Roraima (Bruno 2003, 10). The people call themselves Kinja and call their language Kinja Iara (meaning 'people's language') (Do Vale). The language has many other names such as, Atroahy, Atroahí, Atroarí, Atroaí, Atrowari, Atruahi, Atruahí, Ki'nya, Krishaná, Waimirí, Waimirí-atroarí, Yawaperí (Glottolog). This language seems to have a high transmission as it is spoken by all members of the community and is the main language used for reading and writing (Do Vale).

Contact 
First contact with the Waimiri Atroari occurred in the 17th century with the Spanish and Portuguese crown spreading to gain more territory (Do Vale).  First official contact with the Waimiri Atroari took place in 1884 with Joãno Barbosa Rodrigues who enlisted the Waimiri Atroari as guides. At this point in time the Waimiri Atroari already had a reputation for being violent and Rodrigues sought to change the stereotypes associated with the group (Do Vale).

In 1911 a member of the SPI (Indian Protection Services) made contact with the Waimiri Atroari, the following year the First Indian Attraction Station was established (Do Vale). Despite friendly contact the government of this region saw the great wealth of resources that the native land possessed and encouraged the invasion of the land in order to exploit the natural resources (Do Vale). As a result, the Waimiri Atroari took up defense of their land with bows and arrows. This led to many acts of violence between the Waimiri Atroari and non-indigenous people, with military forces used to combat the indigenous group and wiping out entire villages (Do Vale). The next large scale conflict with the Waimiri Atroari that has been documented is in the 1960s with the Amazonas State and Roraima Territory Government's plan for a highway between Manaus and Caracarai, cutting directly through indigenous land (Do Vale). This project brought in individuals and teams to "pacify" the Waimiri Atroari as well as Military forces to build the highway and intimidate the indigenous people (Do Vale). As a result of high tension and disagreements most of the non-indigenous pacifists were killed by the Waimiri Atroari (Do Vale).

In 1971 the Waimiri Atroari Indigenous Reservation was created, however between plans for Amazonas expansion and the discovery of cassiterite deposits, the government continued to infringe on the land (Do Vale). The reserve was demoted to a Temporary Restricted Area for the Attraction and Pacification of the Waimiri Atroari Indians in 1981 in order to exclude the mineral deposits from their land (Do Vale). Later more land was taken from the Waimiri Atroari as a hydroelectric plant project flooded over 30,000 hectares of their land (Do Vale). Today the Waimiri Atroari have their own school system which they control independently (Do Vale).

Language Family 
Waimiri Atroari belongs to the Carib language family, which is centralized in Northern South America. The Carib languages in northern Brazil are fairly similar, while Waimiri-Atroari is rather different (Moore, 2006, 119). Carib can be categorized into three groups: Northwest Amazon, Guiana area and Upper Xingu Basin. Waimiri Atroari seems to fall into the second group, Guiana area (Bruno 2003, 16).

Documentation 
João Barbosa Rodrigues’ wordlist seems to be the first to document the language in 1885 and he refers to the people as "Crichanas" (Bruno 2003, 12). A century later, in 1985, a phonological proposal and alphabet were developed by a Catholic missionary couple from the Indigenous Missionary Council (Bruno 2010, 85). A year after, in 1986, another missionary couple from the Evangelical Mission of the Amazonian (MEVA), created a more accurate orthography (Bruno 2010, 86).

It seems that the first detailed description was done by Ana Carla Bruno. She released a dissertation in 2003 on the descriptive grammar of the Waimiri-Atroari language. She extensively described the phonology, morphology, lexicon, and syntax of the language. In addition, she has continued detailing the typology of Waimiri-Atroari in further works. In 2004, she published a paper on reduplication in the language. The following two years, she detailed its pronominal system (2005) and causative construction (2006). Then, in 2008 and 2009, she further analyzed the syntactic features of case-marking; phrase structure, clauses and word order. Most recently, she explored the value of linguistic analysis to better language revitalization by analyzing the syllable structure in the orthography and formal education of Waimiri-Atroari (2010).

Projects 
While there are currently no language documentation projects for Wairmiri Atroari, there are projects for other languages in the Carib family. Carib language documentation supported by DOBES include the following languages: Kuikuro, documented by Bruna Franchetto, as well as Kaxuyana and Bakairi, which have been documented by Sergio Meira (Báez et al., 2016, 32).

Phonology

Consonants 

(Bruno 2003, 31)

Vowels 

(Bruno 2003, 32)

Morphology 
Bruno (2003) creates a thorough documentation of the morphology of Waimiri Atroari which includes nouns of possession, relational morphemes, derivational morphemes, pronouns, non-third person pronouns and third-person pronouns. Verbs have also been documented, covering tense/aspect suffixes, mood (imperatives and negation suffix), interrogative clitic, interrogative forms, causative forms and desiderative suffix. Waimiri Atroari also has documentation of adverbs, postpositions, particles and case markings (Bruno 2003).

Pronouns 
Bruno states that pronouns can take both subject and object positions in Waimiri Atroari (76).

1st Person: awy, aa, kara~kra

Subject position  
Bruno states that kara~kra is used when responding to a question or to emphasize that the person did an action or wants something. It is also the only pronoun that can be used in the OSV order (77).

Object position 
It seems that for a 1st person singular object, aa can be used (Bruno 81).

2nd Person: amyry-amyra

Subject position 
(Bruno 2003, 78-79)

Object position 
It seems that the morpheme a is used to express a 2nd person singular object as in the examples (5) (Bruno 2003, 100) and (6) (Bruno 2003,118) below.

1+2 we inclusive : kyky and 1+3 we exclusive: a’a

Subject position 
(Bruno 2003, 79-80)

Object position 
(Bruno 2003, 123)

Anaphoric (he, she, they, it): mykyky, mykyka'a, ka, iry

Subject position 
(Bruno 2003, 80-81)

Object position 
Mykyka and ka can appear in object position, but Bruno notes that ka seems to be the preferred morpheme in her data (81).

(Bruno 2003, 79 & 81)

Proximal: (h)anji, kanji, anjinji, byby, by

Subject position 
(Bruno 2003, 81-82)

By is used to describe animate objects (Bruno 2003, 81).

Medial: myry and Distal: mo’o, mymo’, myky

Subject position 
(Bruno 2003, 82-83)

Myry can only be used to describe inanimate objects (Bruno 82).

Mymo’ and mo’o are used with inanimate objects, while myky is used with animate objects (Bruno 82).

Object position 
(Bruno 2003, 84)

Negation particle 
Waimiri Atroari uses non-verbal negation, that is, negation marked by particles kap~kapy~kapa and wan. These particles act to indicate negation rather than negation being marked on a verb and are often used to negate existence as seen below (Bruno 115).

Causative forms 
There are two kinds of causative forms that can be used to signify if a subject causes an event. First, there is the -py morpheme that indicates if someone “made” someone else do something or if they are not resistant to “cause” an event to happen. There is one construction where the morpheme -py appears with the lexicalized verb, such as in examples (27) and (28), where -py attaches to the verb for 'tell' (Bruno 100).

There is also a form where -py does not appear with a lexicalized verb, such as in examples (29) and (30), where -py attaches to the verbs 'bleed' and 'laugh'. It also seems that intransitive verbs like these, behave like transitive verbs when they take a causative form like V[Intr+Caus [A O]] (Bruno 101).

Second, there is a form that indicates if the subject is “letting” the event happen. Someone is ordered or permitted to do something without forcing the other or knowing if the other may fulfill the event. It seems that there is an absence of the morpheme -py, as in examples (31) and (32), and the particle tre’me is notable, however Bruno notes that the particle tre’me may not mean "let" because of example (33), in which it does not indicate "let/permit" (Bruno 103).

Syntax

Split System-S 
Waimiri Atroari is  what Gildea (1998) classifies to as an Inverse Split system-S. Characteristics of this language system include A and O nominals having no case marking, a lack of auxiliaries and personal prefix set as well as the collective number suffixes (Bruno 2015, 5). In Inverse Split System-s, also referred to as Set I systems the OV unit may either precede or follow the A, in Wamiri Atroari the order is AOV (Bruno 2015, 7).

A Verb-Phrase may be formed with just the verb (Bruno 2015, 7)

A verb may be preceded by a Noun-Phrase (Bruno 2015, 8).

The particle ram cannot separate elements of a single phrase, however it can be used as a tool to determine which element is moved within a sentence (Bruno 2015, 8).

In OSV contexts the object may move independently to subject position rather than the Verb-Phrase preceding the Noun-Phrase through the process of topicalization in which its components cannot be separated (Bruno 2015, 8).

Hierarchy 
Hierarchical relationships exist in Waimiri Atroari in which  the third person is ranked lower than the first, second and first plural inclusive and exclusive person.   In situations where second person acts on first person, or first person acts on second person there is may be subject agreement or object agreement. Therefore, it is necessary that subject and object marking follow a hierarchy : 1=2, 1+2/1+3>3. The following table provided by Bruno (2015, 11) illustrates how case is marked in Waimiri Atroari as well as the hierarchy present in the language.

Semantics

Quantification

Adverbial quantifiers 
Noun phrases which possess quantifiers show positional variation, as seen in examples (5) to (9). Adverbials quantifiers may be positioned on either side of the head noun. Bruno (2003) explains the relative mobility of these quantifiers by categorizing them as adjuncts.

Numeral noun phrases 
Examples (10) to (12) provide examples of the occurrence of the numeral one. (11) is unique in the set as it refers to 'one group' while (10) and (12) refer to one individual (Bruno 2003, 108). Example (13) demonstrates use of the number two and examples (14) and (15) provide depictions of the use of number three (Bruno 2003, 140).

amini ~ awinini -awinihe -awynihe (one, alone) (Bruno 2003, 108)

Typytyna (two, a couple, a pair) (Bruno 2003, 140)

Takynynapa (three) (Bruno 2003, 140)

Loanword influence 
As of recently, due to western influence, Portuguese loanwords are also used to refer to amounts higher than three, and it is common for younger speakers to use them for amounts lower than three (Bruno 2003, 140).

Many 
However, traditionally, it is common for the Kinja people to use waha~wapy ('many, a lot') for amounts more than three because they did not count up to three (Bruno 2003, 140).

References

Languages of Brazil
Cariban languages